Argun is the name of several inhabited localities in Russia.

Urban localities
Argun, Chechen Republic, a town of republic significance in the Chechen Republic, 

Rural localities
Argun, Irkutsk Oblast, a village in Kachugsky District of Irkutsk Oblast, 
Argun, Zabaykalsky Krai, a selo in Sretensky District of Zabaykalsky Krai,